Sanaz Abazarnejad is an Iranian footballer who plays as a defender for Kowsar Women Football League club Shahrdari Sirjan. She has been a member of the senior Iran women's national team.

References 

Living people
Iranian women's footballers
Iran women's international footballers
Women's association football defenders
Year of birth missing (living people)